Saga County is a county of the prefecture-level city of Xigazê in the Tibet Autonomous Region, bordering Nepal to the west and southwest.
Dajia Lake and Jiesa Lake lies in the county.

Town and townships 

 Gya'gya Town - Saga, Tibet
 Changgo Township
 Xungru Township
 Lhagcang Township
 Ru’gyog Township
 Targyailing Township
 Dênggar Township
 Xarru Township

Transport 
China National Highway 219

 
Counties of Tibet
Shigatse